The Tongue Mountain Range Trails are a series of hiking trails located within the Tongue Mountain Range, a subordinate range within the Adirondack Mountains of New York. The trails,  in total length, vary from easy walks along the foot of the mountains on the shore of adjacent Lake George, to more rugged ascents of mountain peaks within the range.

Trail description

The Tongue Mountain Range consists of six summits along the ridge, First Peak, French Point Peak, Fifth Peak, Five Mile Mountain (highest point in Town of Bolton), Huckleberry Mountain and Brown Mountain. The Five Mile Mountain trail takes in Five Mile Mountain, Huckleberry Mountain and Brown Mountain. There are lean-to’s for overnight camping at Fifth Peak and Brown Mountain. The path passes through wooded and open exposed rock areas. Other trails run from Clay Meadow to take in the southern half of the range, First Peak, French Point Peak and Fifth Peak.

Trail vistas take in the Adirondacks, Lake Champlain, and the Green Mountains of Vermont.
Camping and fires are allowed along the Tongue Range Trails within areas designated by the New York Department of Environmental Conservation. Specific regulations are enforced and leave no trace guidelines encouraged.

Geology
The Tongue Mountain Range is composed of quartz-bearing syenite. Tongue Mountain used to be part of the separation between two ancient rivers preceding the modern Lake George.

Ecosystem
The area is a protected wildlife preserve and boasts many species of trees, plants and animals. Dr Patrick L. Cooney of the New York Botany Organisation has listed fifteen species of trees, sixteen fern species, and over sixty species of herbs along the trails. Exposed rocky outcrops along the rock faces are covered with mosses and lichens, and are considered to be fragile habitats. The area is also known for its population of timber rattlesnakes. These are large snakes some approaching  in length.  They enjoy the shelter in the wooded areas but also enjoy basking in the sun on exposed rocks. Numerous birds inhabit or visit the area including various waterfowl and Peregrine Falcons.

The Tongue mountains were once a source of commercial timber. During the 19th century, approximately half the forest of the range fell to the logger's ax.  As late as 1860, 10,000 softwood logs a year were being floated north to the sawmills at Ticonderoga. Hardwoods from the range went to feed the iron forges on Lake Champlain.

Gallery

References

External links
 Topo map of the area
New York DEC web site
Adirondack Mountain Club web site

Hiking trails in New York (state)
Adirondacks
Tourist attractions in Warren County, New York
Protected areas of Warren County, New York